The 2016–17 season was Baskonia's 57th in existence and the club's 34th consecutive season in the top flight of Spanish basketball and the 17th consecutive season in the top flight of European basketball. Baskonia was involved in four competitions.

Players

Squad information

Players in

|}

Total spending:  €0

Players out

|}

Total income:  €590,000

Total expenditure:  €590,000

Club

Technical staff

Kit
Supplier: Hummel / Sponsor: Laboral Kutxa

Pre-season and friendlies

Competitions

Overall

Overview

Supercopa de España

Liga ACB

League table

Results summary

Results by round

Matches

Results overview

EuroLeague

League table

Results summary

Results by round

Matches

Results overview

Copa del Rey

Statistics

Liga ACB

EuroLeague

Copa del Rey

Supercopa de España

References

External links
 Official website
 Saski Baskonia at ACB.com 
 Saski Baskonia at EuroLeague.net

 
Baskonia
Baskonia